The Hà My Massacre was a massacre purportedly conducted by the South Korean Marines on 25 February 1968 of unarmed citizens in Hà My village, Điện Dương commune, Điện Bàn District, Quảng Nam Province in South Vietnam.

Prior to the massacre, Korean forces had visited the village before but were not aggressive or hostile. The massacre was purportedly conducted by the 2nd Marine Division. One survivor's testimony was that Korean forces had entered the village, ordered her family into an underground shelter and threw grenades, killing and wounding members of her family, and even targeted infants. 

According to South Korean anthropologist Heonik Kwon, it was reportedly conducted in retaliation for Vietcong (VC) mortar fire on a ROK Marine Artillery Battery firebase that killed a South Korean Marine artillery Daewi (Captain), a Sangsa (First Sergeant) and four conscripts. The attack was preceded by two hours of shelling by 155 mm artillery, during which two helicopters were circling overhead the village and machine-gunning those that tried to escape. Later helicopters and trucks transported almost 200 Marines to the village who killed many more civilians at close quarters. The victims were 135 women, children and elders from the thirty households. After the massacre, the Marines bulldozed a shallow grave and buried the victims' bodies en masse and later used napalm bombs from helicopters in an attempt to destroy any evidence. Kwon states that this assault against the corpses and graves is remembered as the most inhumane aspect of the incident.

Korean forces returned to the village the next day and had flattened the village. 

The region surrounding the village became a hotbed for VC activity, remaining resistant to Korean forces in the region until they were relegated to guarding bases later that year and until their departure in 1973. The commune would later earn the designation as a Hero District of the People's Armed Forces of the PAVN.

In December 2000, a memorial for the 135 victims was founded in Hà My village.

See also

War Remnants Museum
Military history of South Korea during the Vietnam War
People's Tribunal on War Crimes by South Korean Troops during the Vietnam War

References

External links
Peaceful rest for a victim of massacre in Vietnam
Vietnam’s South Korean Ghosts (New York Times,  JULY 10, 2017)

Massacres in Vietnam
Mass murder in 1968
Massacres in 1968
History of Quảng Nam province
Vietnam War crimes by South Korea
Massacres committed by South Korea
South Korean war crimes
1968 in Vietnam
February 1968 events in Asia
Military history of South Korea during the Vietnam War